Niagara is the fourth studio album by the German stoner rock band Red Aim, released on 20 October 2003 by Metal Blade Records.

Track listing

References 

Red Aim albums
2003 albums